Klára Svatoňová (born 24 January 1993) is a Czech curler from Prague. She currently plays lead on the Czech national team, skipped by Alžběta Baudyšová.

Curling career 
In her first World Junior Curling Championships in 2012, Svatoňová was part of the first ever Czech Republic curling team to win a World Championship medal. Her team won the silver medal, Svatoňová playing second for Zuzana Hájková. The team had a strong performance, finishing the round robin with a 6-3 record, in a five-way tie for second. The team avoided a tie breaker however, and after losing their first playoff game to first place Scotland, they rallied to win the semi-final against Sweden's Sara McManus before losing once again to Scotland's Hannah Fleming in the final.

The team returned to the 2013 World Junior Curling Championships, with fourth-thrower Iveta Janatova now skipping the team. The team finished the round robin with a 5-4 record, in a four-way tie for third place. The team won their tie-breaker match against Denmark's Stephanie Risdal Nielsen before losing to Russia's Yulia Portunova in the playoffs. The team then had to play in the bronze medal game against Japan's Sayaka Yoshimura, which they lost, forcing the team to settle for 4th place.

The next season, Svatoňová joined the Czech women's team, skipped by Anna Kubešková as lead. The team played in the 2013 European Curling Championships, where they finished the event with a 4-5 record in 6th place. The next month, the team played in the Olympic qualifying tournament in order to play at the 2014 Winter Olympics. The team finished the event with a 2-4 record, which was not enough to qualify. Later on, in that season, Svatoňová re-joined her junior team for a final season at the 2014 World Junior Curling Championships. Svatoňová was bumped to the lead position, with Hajkova taking over as skip. The team could not replicate previous successes, finishing with a 3-6 record, in 7th place.

Few days later she played with Kubešková's team at the 2014 Ford World Women's Curling Championship where they finished in 9th place. After returning form Canadas Championship her team lost Czech Nationals and could not represent the country is season 2014/2015. After this season they won Czech nationals again and qualified for 2015 European Curling Championships in Esbjerg. Team skipped by Anna Kubešková finished second in B Group after losing against Italian team skipped by Apollonio and moved up to A group for next season.

In 2016 they played in the 2016 Europeans and finished in 4th place losing to the Swedish team skippered by Anna Hasselborg in the Semi finals, which also qualified them for the 2017 World Women's Curling Championship in Beijing.

In the end of the season 2016/2017 team with Svatoňová on the lead position won Euronics European Masters against the runner up team from Switzerland skippered by Alina Pätz.

Season 2017/2018 started with winning of International Women's Curling Tournament in Wetzikon. In the November Svatoňová and her team came back to Switzerland for 2017 European Curling Championships and with the record 3-6 the team could not replicate previous successes and finished in 7th place. It was enough to qualify for 2018 Ford World Women's Curling Championship in North Bay, Canada. The most important event came right after Europeans. The team played after four years another Qualification tournament because they did not score enough points from 2014 and 2015 Worlds. Olympic Qualification Tournament held place in Plzeň, Czech Republic. After round robin Svatoňová and her team with Anna Kubešková as skip, Alžběta Baudyšová as third, Tereza Plíšková as second, Ezhen Kolchevskaia as alternate and coach Karel Kubeška, finished fourth and did not get chance to fight for top two places.

In March 2018 they improved Czech current best placement and finished 6th on Worlds in Canada losing Russia in play-offs (Victoria Moiseeva) with 6-6 record.

Personal life
As of 2022, she is a student.

References

http://www.worldcurling.org/wwcc2018/qualification-games

External links
 

1993 births
Living people
Czech female curlers
Sportspeople from Prague
Czech curling champions
21st-century Czech women